Paiska High School, is a non-government educational institution in Paiska, Tangail, Dhaka Division, Bangladesh established in 1932. The school offers education for students ranging from six to SSC (Secondary School Certificate) with over 500 students. The school is under the direct control of the Ministry of Education.

Location
The school is beside Dhanbari-Kendua highway Paiska, Vatkura, Dhanbari Upazila, 65 km from Tangail, Mymensingh and Jamalpur district headquarters and 190 km from Dhaka city. The school is on the bank of Bairan canal.

Gallery

References

External links

 

Schools in Tangail District